This article presents a list of the historical events and publications of Australian literature during 1945.

Events 
 June – Ern Malley hoax: Australia's most celebrated literary hoax takes place when Angry Penguins is published with poems by the fictional Ern Malley. Poets James McAuley and Harold Stewart created the poems from lines of other published work and then sent them as the purported work of a recently deceased poet. The hoax is played on Max Harris, at this time a 22-year-old avant garde poet and critic who had started the modernist magazine Angry Penguins. Harris and his circle of literary friends agreed that a hitherto completely unknown modernist poet of great merit had come to light in suburban Australia. The Autumn 1944 edition of the magazine with the poems comes out in mid-1945 due to wartime printing delays with cover illustration by Sidney Nolan. An Australian newspaper uncovers the hoax within weeks. McAuley and Stewart loved early Modernist poets but despise later modernism and especially the well-funded Angry Penguins and are jealous of Harris's precocious success.

Books 
 Eleanor Dark – The Little Company
 Michael Innes – Appleby's End
 Will Lawson – The Lady of the Heather
 Jack Lindsay – Hello Stranger
 Norman Lindsay – The Cousin from Fiji
 Nevil Shute – Most Secret
 Arthur Upfield – Death of a Swagman
 Morris West – Moon in My Pocket

Short stories 
 A. Bertram Chandler – "Giant Killer"
 Alan Marshall – "Wild Red Horses"
 Dal Stivens – "The Man Who Bowled Victor Trumper"

Children's and Young Adult fiction 
 Ruth C. Williams
 Our Friend Rodney
 Pirate's Gold

Poetry 

 Emily Bulcock – From Quenchless Springs
 Hugh McCrae – Voice of the Forest: Poems
 J. S. Manifold – "The Tomb of Lt. John Learmonth, AIF"
 Ian Mudie – Poems: 1934-1944
 Colin Thiele – Splinters and Shards: Poems
 David McKee Wright – The Station Ballads and Other Verses
 Judith Wright – "The Surfer"

Awards and honours

Literary

Births 
A list, ordered by date of birth (and, if the date is either unspecified or repeated, ordered alphabetically by surname) of births in 1945 of Australian literary figures, authors of written works or literature-related individuals follows, including year of death.

 2 January – Diane Fahey, poet
 7 February – Jill Jolliffe, journalist and non-fiction writer (died 2022)
 15 February – Jack Dann, novelist and editor
 23 February – Robert Gray, poet
 19 March – Mark O'Connor, poet
 6 April – Peter Skrzynecki, poet
 2 June – Michael Leunig, cartoonist and poet
 7 October – Hal Colebatch, poet and novelist (died 2019)
 5 December – Joanne Burns, poet

Unknown date
 Hazel Edwards, writer for children
Robert J. Merritt, playwright (died 2011)

Deaths 
A list, ordered by date of death (and, if the date is either unspecified or repeated, ordered alphabetically by surname) of deaths in 1945 of Australian literary figures, authors of written works or literature-related individuals follows, including year of birth.

 10 March – G. B. Lancaster, novelist (born 1873)
 10 July – Jack Moses, poet (born 1861)
 5 November – Norma Davis, poet (born 1905)

See also 
 1945 in literature
 1945 in poetry
 List of years in literature
 List of years in Australian literature
 1945 in literature
 1944 in Australian literature
 1945 in Australia
 1946 in Australian literature

References

Literature
Australian literature by year
20th-century Australian literature
1945 in literature